To be reflected is to undergo a change in direction at an interface between two different media.

Reflected may also refer to:

 Reflected: Greatest Hits Vol. 2, a 2006 country album
 "Reflected" (song), a 1969 psychedelic rock song

See also

 Reflection (disambiguation)
 Reflector (disambiguation)